Mohammad Edo Febriansah (born 25 July 1997) is an Indonesian professional footballer who plays for Liga 1 club RANS Nusantara and the Indonesia national team. He plays mainly as a left back, but can also operate as a left winger.

Club career

PS Bengkulu
He was signed for PS Bengkulu to play in Liga 2 in the 2017 season.

Persiwa Wamena
In 2018, Edo Febriansah signed a one-year contract with Indonesian Liga 2 club Persiwa Wamena. He made 20 league appearances and scored 6 goals for Persiwa Wamena.

Persik Kediri
In 2019, Edo signed a one-year contract with Indonesian Liga 2 club Persik Kediri. On 25 November 2019 Persik successfully won the 2019 Liga 2 Final and promoted to Liga 1, after defeated Persita Tangerang 3–2 at the Kapten I Wayan Dipta Stadium, Gianyar. He made 20 league appearances and scored 1 goal for Persik Kediri.

Persita Tangerang
He was signed for Persita Tangerang to play in Liga 1 in the 2020 season. Edo made his debut on 1 March 2020 in a match against Bali United. On 6 March 2020, Edo scored his first goal for Persita against PSM Makassar in the 59th minute at the Indomilk Arena, Tangerang. This season was suspended on 27 March 2020 due to the COVID-19 pandemic. The season was abandoned and was declared void on 20 January 2021.

On 24 September 2021, Edo scored his first goal of the season, scoring in the 84th minute, final result, Persita lose 1–2 over Bali United in the 2021–22 Liga 1. On 27 October 2021, he scored in a 2–2 draw over Arema.

RANS Nusantara
Edo was signed for RANS Nusantara to play in Liga 1 in the 2022–23 season. He made his league debut on 23 July 2022 in a match against PSIS Semarang at the Jatidiri Stadium, Semarang which ended in a 1–1 draw, also give assists a goal by Makan Konaté. Edo give another assists in a 3–3 draw over PSS Sleman six days later at Pakansari Stadium, Edo's low pass was finished by David Laly with a hard kick in the opponent's defense area. Edo scored his first league goals in a 1–2 win over Persebaya Surabaya, scoring a brace, on 15 September.

On 25 January 2023, Edo scored in a 4–4 draw over Bali United. He added his fourth goals of the season on 28 February against Persebaya in a 2–2 draw, he was also selected as man of the match in that match. And continued scored his fifth goal of the season in a 2–3 lose against Persis Solo on 10 March.

International career
In 2016, Edo represented the Indonesia U-19, in the 2016 AFF U-19 Youth Championship.

In November 2021, Indonesian coach, Shin Tae-yong sent Edo his first call up to the full national side, for the friendly matches in Turkey against Afghanistan and Myanmar. He made his official international debut for Indonesia national team on 25 November 2021, against Myanmar in a friendly match in Antalya, Turkey.

In November 2022, it was reported that Edo received a call-up from the Indonesia for a training camp, in preparation for the 2022 AFF Championship. He played the full 90 minutes in a 7–0 away win against Brunei on 26 December, give two assists to goal by Egy Maulana Vikri (59th minutes) and Yakob Sayuri (92nd minutes).

Career statistics

Club

International

Honours

Club
Persik Kediri
 Liga 2: 2019

International
Indonesia
 AFF Championship runner-up: 2020

References

External links
 Edo Febriansyah at Soccerway
 Edo Febriansyah at Liga Indonesia

1997 births
Living people
Indonesian footballers
People from Kediri (city)
Sportspeople from East Java
Persiwa Wamena players
Persik Kediri players
Persita Tangerang players
RANS Nusantara F.C. players
Indonesia youth international footballers
Indonesia international footballers
Liga 1 (Indonesia) players
Liga 2 (Indonesia) players
Association football wingers
Association football fullbacks
21st-century Indonesian people